Anna-Maria Zimmermann (born 14 December 1988 in Gütersloh, North Rhine-Westphalia) is a German singer and a Deutschland sucht den Superstar participant in 2006. Zimmermann was injured in a helicopter accident when a Robinson R44 type helicopter crashed into the ground on 24 October 2010.

Discography

Albums 
 2010: Einfach Anna!
 2012: Hautnah
 2013: Sternstunden
 2015: Bauchgefühl
 2017: himmelbLAu
 2018: Sorgenfrei

Singles 
 2007: "Der erste Kuss" (Jojos feat. Anna-Maria Zimmermann)
 2008: "Wer ist dieser DJ?"
 2009: "1000 Träume weit (Tornerò)"
 2010: "Hurra wir leben noch"
 2010: "Frei sein"
 2010: "7 Wolken"
 2011: "100.000 leuchtende Sterne"
 2012: "Leben"
 2012: "Mit dir"
 2012: "Freundschaftsring" (Duet with Olaf Henning)
 2013: "Non plus ultra"
 2014: "Tanz"
 2014: "Die Tanzfläche brennt"
 2014: "Nur noch einmal schlafen"
 2014: "Letzte Weihnacht"
 2015: "Du hast mir so den Kopf verdreht"
 2016: "Tinte" (Duet with Achim Petry)
 2016: "Frohe Weihnacht" (Duet with Achim Petry)
 2017: "Himmelblaue Augen"
 2017: "Verheddert"
 2018: "Scheiß egal"

References

External links 
 
 

1988 births
Deutschland sucht den Superstar participants
Living people
People from Gütersloh
21st-century German women singers